Edward Butler (March 20, 1762 – May 6, 1803) was an officer in the United States Army who served as acting Adjutant General and acting Inspector General of the U.S. Army from 1793 to 1794 and from 1796 to 1797.

Early life 
Edward Butler was born on March 20, 1762 in West Pennsboro Township, Pennsylvania.  He was one of five Butler brothers from Pennsylvania who served in the American Revolution.

Military career 
Butler was commissioned an ensign in the 9th Pennsylvania Regiment on July 1, 1778 at the age of 16.  He was promoted to lieutenant on January 28, 1779 and transferred to the 5th Pennsylvania Regiment on January 17, 1781.  He was again transferred to the 3rd Pennsylvania Regiment on January 1, 1783 and was discharged on November 3, 1783 when the Continental Army was disbanded.

He was on original member of the Society of the Cincinnati along with three of his brothers.

He was a captain in the levies under Major General Arthur St. Clair and saw action at St. Clair's Defeat in which his brother Richard was killed and his brother Thomas was wounded.

He was commissioned a captain in the United States Army on March 5, 1792 and transferred to the 4th Sub-Legion on September 4, 1792.

On July 18, 1793 he was appointed Adjutant and Inspector of the United States Army and served until May 13, 1794.  He was assigned as a captain in the 4th Infantry Regiment on November 1, 1796.  He was transferred to the 2nd Infantry Regiment on April 1, 1802.

He died on May 6, 1803.

See also 
 List of Adjutant Generals of the U.S. Army
 List of Inspectors General of the U.S. Army

Notes

References

External links 
 Butler Family Papers at The Historic New Orleans Collection 
 American Revolution Institute

1762 births
1803 deaths
Continental Army officers from Pennsylvania
Adjutants general of the United States Army
American people of the Northwest Indian War
Inspectors General of the United States Army
People from Cumberland County, Pennsylvania